Tomás Pablo Asta-Buruaga Montoya (born 11 October 1996) is a Chilean footballer who plays for Unión La Calera on loan from Universidad Católica as a central defender.

Club career

Unión Española
Born in Santiago, Asta-Buruaga was an Unión Española youth graduate. On 29 July 2012, aged just 15, he made his senior debut for the reserve team by playing the full 90 minutes in a 1–0 Segunda División Profesional de Chile away loss against Deportes Iberia.

Asta-Buruaga made his first team debut on 23 July 2013, starting in a 3–0 Copa Chile home win against Palestino. A regular figure for the B-team in the following campaigns, he made his Primera División debut on 22 February 2014, starting in a 3–1 home defeat to Everton de Viña del Mar.

Deportes Antofagasta
For the 2016–17 season, Asta-Buruaga was loaned to fellow top tier club Deportes Antofagasta. Rarely used, he scored his first goal 20 November 2016, netting his team's only in a 5–1 loss at Universidad Católica.

Bought outright in mid-2017, Asta-Buruaga subsequently became a regular starter for the side.

Career statistics

Honours
Unión Española
Supercopa de Chile: 2013

Universidad Católica

Primera División de Chile: 2020, 2021
Supercopa de Chile: 2020, 2021

References

External links
 

Living people
1996 births
Chilean footballers
Chilean people of Basque descent
Association football defenders
Chilean Primera División players
Unión Española footballers
C.D. Antofagasta footballers